Egamnazar Muftillayevich Akbarov (born July 18, 1976 in Tashkent) is an Uzbek judoka, who competed in the men's lightweight category. He picked up a total of eight medals in his career, including a gold from the 2001 Summer Universiade in Beijing, China and a bronze from the 2002 Asian Games in Busan, South Korea, and represented his nation Uzbekistan in the 73-kg class at the 2004 Summer Olympics.

Akbarov made sporting headlines at the 2001 Summer Universiade in Beijing, where he threw South Korea's Choi Yong-sin in the closing seconds to grab the gold medal in the 73-kg division. When South Korea hosted the 2002 Asian Games in Busan, Akbarov missed a chance for another gold with a stunning defeat to his former rival Choi in the semifinals by the mighty commotion of the home crowd inside Gudeok Gymnasium, but redeemed himself to score a waza-ari awasete ippon victory over Mongolia's Damdiny Süldbayar for the bronze medal.

At the 2004 Summer Olympics in Athens, Akbarov qualified for the Uzbek squad in the men's lightweight class (73 kg), by placing fifth and receiving a berth from the World Championships in Osaka, Japan. In the opening round, Akbarov conceded with two shido penalties and then suffered a striking defeat on yuko points and a pacifying assault to Cameroon's Bernard Mvondo-Etoga at the end of the five-minute match.

References

External links

1976 births
Living people
Uzbekistani male judoka
Olympic judoka of Uzbekistan
Judoka at the 2004 Summer Olympics
Judoka at the 2002 Asian Games
Asian Games medalists in judo
Sportspeople from Tashkent
Asian Games bronze medalists for Uzbekistan
Medalists at the 2002 Asian Games
Universiade medalists in judo
Universiade gold medalists for Uzbekistan